Vanderbilt Reef is a rocky outcropping in Lynn Canal, a fjord in Alaska, United States at .  The outcropping is visible just above the water's surface.

On October 25, 1918, the Canadian Pacific steamer  ran aground on Vanderbilt Reef in the early morning during poor visibility.  The ship remained lodged in the reef for 40 hours, the end of which saw a large storm develop.  The ship broke apart at night, and all on board were lost.

External links
 Reef location

Reefs of the Pacific Ocean
Landforms of Juneau, Alaska
Reefs of Alaska